Bulgaria is a country in southeastern Europe. It is bordered by Romania to the north, Serbia and North Macedonia to the west, Greece and Turkey to the south, and the Black Sea to the east. Bulgaria's population of 7.4 million people is predominantly urbanised and mainly concentrated in the administrative centres of its 28 provinces. Most commercial and cultural activities are centred on the capital and largest city, Sofia. The strongest sectors of the economy are heavy industry, power engineering, and agriculture, all of which rely on local natural resources.

For further information on the types of business entities in this country and their abbreviations, see "Business entities in Bulgaria".

Notable firms 
This list includes notable companies with primary headquarters located in the country. The industry and sector follow the Industry Classification Benchmark taxonomy. Organizations which have ceased operations are included and noted as defunct.

See also
 Economy of Bulgaria
 List of banks in Bulgaria

References 

Bulgaria